The IEEE Frederik Philips Award is  a Technical Field Award that was established by the IEEE in 1971.  The award is presented for outstanding accomplishments in the management of research and development resulting in effective innovation in the electrical and electronics industry.
This award may be presented to an individual or team of up to three people.
Recipients of this award receive a bronze medal, certificate, and honorarium.

Recipients

 2020: Kazuo Yano
 2019: Asad M. Madni
 2018: Ian A. Young
 2017: Gary L. Patton
 2016: Kelin J. Kuhn
 2015: Benedetto Vigna
 2014: Henry T. Nicholas, III
 2013: William M. Holt
 2012: Chih-Yuan (C. Y.) Lu
 2011: Dim-Lee Kwong
 2010: John E. Kelly III
 2009: Shojiro Asai
 2008: Gilbert J. Declerck
 2007: Yong-Kyung (Kenneth) Lee
 2006: Louis C. Parrillo
 2005: Hiroyoshi Komiya
 2004: Youssef El-Mansy
 2003: Thomas Rowbotham
 2002: Toshiharu Aoki
 2001: Arun N. Netravali
 2000: Gerald M. Borsuk
 1999: Roger J. Van Overstraeten
 1998: William C. Holton
 1998: Robert M. Burger
 1998: Larry W. Sumney
 1997: Roland P. O. Hüber
 1996: Michiyuki Uenohara
 1995: James C. McGroddy
 1994: Minoru Nagata
 1993: Max Tibor Weiss
 1992: Alan Gerald Chynoweth
 1991: Gene Strull
 1990: Rajinder J. Khosla
 1989: Klaus D. Bowers
 1988: George F. Smith
 1987: Solomon J. Buchsbaum
 1986: William Hittinger
 1985: George Heilmeier
 1984: John K. Galt
 1983: Allen E. Puckett
 1982: Werner J. Kleen
 1981: Dean A. Watkins
 1980: William M. Webster
 1979: Gordon Moore
 1978: William E. Shoupp
 1977: No Award
 1976: Koji Kobayashi
 1975: C. Lester Hogan
 1974: Chauncey Guy Suits
 1973: John H. Dessauer
 1972: William O. Baker
 1971: Frederik J. Philips

References

External links 
 IEEE Frederik Philips Award page at IEEE
 List of recipients of the IEEE Frederik Philips Award

Frederik Philips Award